Tom-Yum-Goong (Thai: ต้มยำกุ้ง) is a 2005 Thai martial arts action film starring Tony Jaa. The film was directed by Prachya Pinkaew, who also directed Jaa's prior breakout film Ong-Bak. As with Ong-Bak, the fights were choreographed by Jaa and his mentor, Panna Rittikrai. The film was distributed as Warrior King in the United Kingdom, as The Protector in the United States, as Thai Dragon in Spain, as Revenge of the Warrior in Germany, and as Honor of the Dragon in Russia and CIS countries. In India, it was named Haathi Mere Saathi (literally elephant, my partner), from a name of another Bollywood film starring Rajesh Khanna.

Plot

Kham is the last of a family line of guards who once watched over the King of Thailand's war elephants. Following tradition, he takes great care in raising the animals. Kham grows up forming close relations to his elephant, Por Yai and its calf, Kohrn. During the Songkran festival, the animals are stolen by elephant poachers, with help from Mr. Suthep, a local MP, and his son. Kham raids Mr. Suthep's house and beats up the poachers. However, the elephants are now in the hands of Johnny, a Vietnamese gangster who runs Tom Yum Goong Otob, a Thai restaurant in Sydney, Australia.

Kham arrives in Sydney and is immediately taken hostage by a wanted thief. Sydney police officers Mark, a Thai-Australian, and his partner Rick corner the thief, who holds Kham at gunpoint. However, a second policeman, Inspector Vincent, shoots the thief dead. He then arrests Kham, accusing him of being another thief. In the car, Kham spots Johnny at Tom Yum Goong. Kham becomes erratic and urges Mark and Rick to arrest Johnny, to no avail. After causing the car to crash, Kham escapes. He follows Johnny , who flees, forcing Kham to fight his henchmen. Hs coerces a henchman to lead him to Johnny's hideout, interrupting a drug deal. Outraged, Johnny summons extreme sports enthusiasts to fight Kham. After defeating the thugs, Kham is exhausted and falls asleep in an alley. Pla, a prostitute that Kham met while confronting Johnny, brings him to her apartment.

Mark and Rick are taken off the case and reassigned to provide security for the Police Commissioner's meeting with Mr. Sim. In that meeting, Pla acts as a hostess girl and dancer to the two men. Mr. Sim and the Commissioner are then murdered by someone hired by Vincent. However, the murder is caught on the commissioner's camera. Vincent kills Rick and puts the blame on Mark, who is later captured.

With Pla's help, Kham enters Tom Yum Goong Otob. He fights his way into the VIP area and reaches the dining hall at the top. In the protection of his men, Johnny taunts Kham with Kohrn's bell. This enrages Kham, who beats up his opponents. He enters the storage area, containing various exotic animals ready to be butchered and eaten. Kham finds and frees Mark and Kohrn, escaping minutes before the police arrive.

Inspector Vincent initiates a search for Kham and Mark, who are hiding in a Buddhist monastery. Soon after their departure, the monastery is set on fire by Vincent and his men. Believing that the temple and its inhabitants might be in danger, Mark and Kham decide to return. After arriving, Kham is confronted by three assassins: a fierce capoeirista, a sword-wielding wushu expert, and T.K., a giant wrestler. Kham defeats the first two, but T.K. proves too strong for him. Kham is about to be killed when the police arrive, and Mark comes to help him flee. Mark is later discovered by several policemen and sent to deal with Inspector Vincent, whom Pla has been revealed to be the murderer.

Kham arrives at a hall where Madame Rose, the leader of the Chinese gang, is having a press conference. Kohrn runs in, scaring off people while Kham engages the gangsters. Mark apprehends Vincent, who Johnny then fatally shoots to "settle the score."

Finding himself with Kohrn in a huge room, Kham is shown the skeleton of Por Yai, encrusted with jewels as a gift to Madame Rose. Her men then attack Kham, who now fights more brutally than ever before, breaking many of the men's arms and legs. T.K. is called in, along with three others. Kohrn is thrown through a glass wall, and Kham is knocked into the elephant ornament, causing two leg bones to fall off. Eventually, Kahm defeats the four wrestlers by using the sharp ends of the bones to slice their tendons. He stops Madame Rose before she can escape in a helicopter, and they both crash into the room below. Kham's fall is broken by Por Yai's tusks.

At the end, Mark is forgiven by his boss, Inspector Lamond, and Kham is finally reunited with Kohrn.

Cast
Tony Jaa as Kham, the last of a family line of guards who once watched over the King of Thailand's war elephants. Kham is characterized by the juxtaposition of his red krama scarf throughout the film. As he grows up, he bonds closely with his elephant Por Yai and its calf, Korn. When they are stolen, Kham journeys to Sydney, Australia to get them back. Actor Nutdanai Kong portrays 9-year-old Kham.
Sotorn Rungruaeng as Kham's father, who taught Kham the fighting style of the Jaturangkabat, the royal guardians of the Thai war elephants. It has been Kham's father's dream that his elephant Por Yai would be selected as one of the Royal Thai elephants. However, during a fake inspection staged by a local member of parliament, his elephants are stolen, and he is wounded by a gunshot.
Petchtai Wongkamlao as Sergeant Mark, a Thai-Australian policeman who patrols an area of Sydney populated by Asians. He is so popular there that the locals often do him favors like giving him free mangoes and haircuts.
Bongkoj Khongmalai as Pla, a Thai student in Sydney who is forced to be a call girl to repay the debt of her former boyfriend, the late Wittaya who used to own Tom Yum Goong Otob, a Thai restaurant.
Xing Jin as Madame Rose, a transsexual member of a Chinese gang in Sydney, who is in conflict with the leader, her Uncle Mr. Sim.
Damian De Montemas as Inspector Vincent, a corrupt policeman in Sydney who collaborates with Madame Rose.
David Asavanond as Officer Rick, Sergeant Mark's partner.
Nathan Jones (credited as Nathan B. Jones) as T.K., a giant wrestler proves to be more than a match for Kham.
Johnny Tri Nguyen as Johnny, a Vietnamese gangster and he use of martial arts is Vovinam is a subordinate of Madame Rose. He is responsible for her drug deals and the running of the Tom Yum Goong Otob.
Lateef Crowder as a capoeirista who fights Kham in the Buddhist monastery. He has the word "Pray" carved to his chest.
Jon Foo (Jonathan Patrick Foo) as a wushu exponent who is Kham's second opponent in the monastery.

Cameo appearances
 Pumwaree Yodkamol, who co-starred in Ong-Bak: Muay Thai Warrior, is seen briefly, portraying a Thai tourist in a Sydney street scene. She berates a friend of hers about DVD piracy.
 Wannakit Sirioput who also co starred in Ong Bak (as Don) cameos at the end of the film as Mark's new partner.
 An impressionist portrays Jackie Chan, whom Kham briefly encounters at the airport in Sydney. In real life, Chan is one of Jaa's idols .
 Another impressionist portrays Thai rocker Sek Loso, the pitchman for the M-150 energy drink, which is among the brands with product placement throughout the film.
 Actors Don Ferguson, Erik Markus Schuetz, Lex de Groot (uncredited) and Damian Mavis (uncredited) appear as bodyguards.
 Bodybuilders Heinz Ollesch, Philip George Pfister, and Rene Minkwitz appear as wrestlers.

Production

Technical aspects
Compared to Ong-Bak: Muay Thai Warrior, which was noted for its lack of wirework and CGI, this movie uses CGI in several scenes, from the obvious (helicopter scene, and an entirely computer-animated dream sequence), to the subtle (a glass window shattering in the four-minute steadicam long take that follows Jaa up several flights of stairs as he dispatches thug after thug in dramatic fashion).

The largest example of CGI is Tony Jaa's dramatic leap from the top of a building to attack Madame Rose with a double knee attack. While the background was blue screen with the Australian backdrop added in post production, the long fall shown on screen was real as Jaa and a stuntperson pulled the scene off, landing on large mats below. Even in scenes like this with blue screen, normally a stunt double would be called in for the lead actor, but Jaa once again made sure he did the stunt himself.

Fighting styles
Tony Jaa and Panna Rittikrai created a new style of Muay Thai for this movie called muay kodchasaan  (มวยคชสาร roughly translated as "elephant boxing"), emphasizing grappling moves. "I wanted to show the art of the elephant combined with muay Thai," Tony told the Associated Press in an interview, adding that the moves imitate how an elephant would defend itself, with the arms acting as the trunk.

Stuntwork
Many aspiring stuntmen sent demo tapes, hoping to be cast in the film. An American stunt actor was cast but did not properly take the impact and was injured on the first take. "He kicked me, I used my arm to block his kick, and he fell down hard," Tony told the Associated Press.

However, no one was hospitalized in the making of the film, with injuries limited to "bumps and bruises, muscle tears, a little something like that. Nothing major," Tony said.

The fights include duels with:
 Wushu practitioner (portrayed by John Foo).
 A Vietnamese triad captain (portrayed by Spider-man stunt double Johnny Nguyen).
 A capoeirista (portrayed by Lateef Crowder of the ZeroGravity stunt team).
 An extraordinarily large and strong bodyguard (portrayed by former WWE wrestler Nathan Jones).
 A whip-wielding triad boss (portrayed by world-renowned ballerina Jing Xing).
 Two taekwondo fighters (portrayed by Daniel O'Neill and Dean Alexandrou) in a deleted two-vs-one scene in the temple.

Alternative versions
International sales rights (outside Asia) were purchased by TF1, which made suggestions for re-editing to director Prachya Pinkaew, who then made some cuts that slightly reduce the film's running time from its original 108 minutes.

The UK title is Warrior King, and the theatrical release was on 28 July 2006. In France and Belgium, the title is L'Honneur du dragon, and in the Netherlands and other European it is Honour of the Dragon. In Cambodia, the film is called Neak Prodal Junboth. In India, it was named Haathi Mere Saathi (literally elephant, my partner), from a name of another Bollywood film starring Rajesh Khanna.

Deleted scenes 
A two-vs-one fight scene taking place in the burning temple near the end of the film was deleted from currently released versions of the film. The taekwondo sequence, featuring Dean Alexandrou and Daniel O'Neill is shown in part in nearly all promotional trailers for the film, but was cut due to unknown reasons from the final release. However footage can be seen in the making-of featurettes, and some behind-the-scenes VCDs. The two bodies are seen to mysteriously appear on the temple floor, near the beginning of the temple fight scene.

Prachya Pinkaew stated that he trimmed several of the fight scenes due to their length. Some of these include the sequence on the bridge in Sydney, when Kham confronts Johnny and his henchmen for the first time. One can see in certain trailers Kham launching himself off of the shoulders of one henchmen to elbow the other one. Another sequence that he trimmed considerably was the warehouse fight scene.

In the U.S. release of Tom-Yum-Goong, where it was named The Protector, there is a deleted scene of Kham beginning his ambush of the house party by the criminal group who stole his elephants. In all of its releases, the fight sequence begins with Tony Jaa throwing a henchman down the stairs. But this deleted scene shows where the fight really began.

US release
The Weinstein Company purchased the U.S. distribution rights for Tom-Yum-Goong and retitled it The Protector (also the name of a 1985 film starring Jackie Chan). This version was released theatrically on 8 September 2006. It was released in January 2007 on DVD on The Weinstein Company's Dragon Dynasty label in a two-disc set that includes both the U.S. edit and the original Thai version of the film.

For the US theatrical cut, the film's length was reduced by at least 25 minutes, going so far as to trim down some of the fight scenes, even though it was given an "R" rating restricting audiences to people aged 17 and over. Out of all cuts outside of Thailand, it is the shortest cut of the film, even more so than the European cuts. It also features a new score by RZA. Some parts of the missing footage (including cuts to the "bone breaker" fight and Madame Rose envisioning herself in a red dress as queen) appeared in the U.S. trailer and TV Spots.

Also, The Protector is partially subtitled and partially dubbed, with all of Jaa's dialogue subtitled. Several changes were made to the plot through editing and subtitles that did not match the spoken Thai and Chinese dialogue.

Changes that were made to the US theatrical release include:
 The historical role of the Thai warriors is given in more detail in the opening prologue
 Scenes of TV reporters given tour of Sydney by Sgt. Mark are removed.
 Scenes of Sgt. Mark handling robbery and releasing the would-be assassin are removed.
 Kham's father, rather than being injured, died by the gunshot.
 Tony Jaa's lines now include "You killed my father!"
 Madame Rose loses face and is denied a "security" contract over bad turtle soup instead of the Chinese business leader's refusal to deal because of bad terms.
 Madame Rose's transsexuality is never mentioned.
 The ending has been trimmed to imply that Madame Rose is dead rather than just injured after her fall through the roof.
 Johnny does not return to kill Vincent after Vincent was apprehended by Mark.
 Exposition is given to further explain the cutting of tendons to defeat the bruisers at the end.
 The ending epilogue given by Sgt. Mark in the US version is significantly different and nobler than the Thai version, which is whimsical and comic relief in tone and is much less concerned with resolution.

Reception

Box office
Tom-Yum-Goong opened in Thailand on 11 August 2005, and grossed US$1,609,720 in its first weekend and was No. 1 at the Thai box office (normally dominated by Hollywood imports) for two weeks in a row. It ended its Thai run with US$4,417,800, blockbuster business by Thai standards.

The Weinstein Company released Tom-Yum-Goong in North America in a heavily edited version entitled The Protector, which was the third release by their Dragon Dynasty label. It was also given the "Quentin Tarantino Presents" brand, which had proven lucrative in the past for films like Hero and Hostel. It opened in 1,541 cinemas on 8 September 2006 and ranked No. 4 in its opening weekend, grossing $5,034,180 ($3,226 per screen). It ended its run with $12,044,087. In the US, it ranks 67th among martial arts films and 14th among foreign films.

The film's total worldwide box office gross is US$25,715,096. It is the most successful Thai film released in the US.

Critical response 
On Review aggregator website, Rotten Tomatoes gives the film a score of 53% out of 91 reviews, with an average rating of 5.5/10. The critical consensus reads, "Despite some impressive fight scenes, this trimmed-down version of the Thai action pic is an off-putting mix of scant plot, choppy editing, and confusing subtitles and dubbing."

Combat sports and striking analyst Jack Slack has written that Tony Jaa's multiple attackers scene in the film is "the best fight in movie history".

Sequel
A sequel, Tom Yum Goong 2, was released in 2013. It was also released in the US as The Protector 2.

See also

References

External links

 The elephant Plai Bua Barn, starring in the film. (The elephant database)

United Kingdom Official site
 Tom Yum Goong review at cityonfire.com

2005 films
2005 action films
2000s Mandarin-language films
Thai-language films
Fiction about animal cruelty
English-language Thai films
Capoeira films
Films about organised crime in Australia
Films set in Sydney
Films set in Thailand
Films shot in Sydney
Films shot in Thailand
Films with live action and animation
Thai martial arts films
Thai Muay Thai films
Muay Thai films
Sahamongkol Film International films
Wushu films
Films directed by Prachya Pinkaew
Transgender-related films
Films about elephants
Films about trans women
2005 LGBT-related films
Triad films
2000s English-language films
Thai LGBT-related films
2000s Hong Kong films